Sir Tofiga Vaevalu Falani,  is a Tuvaluan reverend who has served as Governor-General of Tuvalu since 2021 and the President of the Church of Tuvalu since 2008. In his capacity as Church President, he has represented the church at meetings of the World Council of Churches, Central Committee in 2009  and 2011.

Governor-General of Tuvalu

In September 2021, Falani was appointed Governor-General by then Queen Elizabeth II. 

As Governor-General, Falani represents the reigning Monarch of Tuvalu (at present Charles III) in the country, therefore effectively acting as Tuvalu's head of state. Falani previously served as Acting Governor-General on 14 August 2017 during the absence of the Governor-General, Iakoba Taeia Italeli, at the time.

Honours
He was appointed as a Member of the Order of the British Empire (MBE) for public and community service in the 2014 New Year Honours.

On 18 September 2022, Falani was appointed by Charles III, King of Tuvalu, as a Knight Grand Cross of the Order of St Michael and St George (GCMG).

References 

Governors-General of Tuvalu
Knights Grand Cross of the Order of St Michael and St George
Living people
Members of the Order of the British Empire
Tuvaluan people
Tuvaluan religious leaders
Year of birth missing (living people)